Bgheri Cave Natural Monument, also known as Bgheristskali cave, is a seasonal karst cave located near road between villages of Kumistavi and Qvilishori in Tsqaltubo Municipality in Imereti region of Georgia.

Morphology 
Made of reef limestone (Barremian) cave was created by river Bgheristskali. Initially the river creates a gorge with no openings and then flows into a narrow pond. Here Bgheristskali river is joined by permanent water flows from Melouri and Didghele caves. The river crosses an open space from east to west and disappears at the western ending in Nazvavi river and a small shallow siphon. 
Effects of erosion activity are clearly visible inside Bgheri Cave. It is characterized by huge halls, underground rivers with beautiful waterfalls and many amazing cave formations. Bgheri cave is part of extensive Tsqaltubo Cave system which also includes nearby cave Melouri.

Tourist information 
Access to the  cave is seasonal. Cave entrance is closed during seasonal floods at Bgeristskali river.  Visitors without special equipment can enter cave only at a time of droughts, when the level of the water is low and the entrance is opened.

See also 
 List of natural monuments of Georgia
 Didghele Cave Natural Monument
 Prometheus Cave Natural Monument

References

Natural monuments of Georgia (country)
Caves of Georgia (country)
Protected areas established in 2011
Geography of Imereti